Jill Tolles (born April 9, 1974) is an American politician and a former Republican member of the Nevada Assembly. She represented the 25th district, which covers parts of Washoe County.

Biography
Tolles, born in Greensboro, North Carolina, graduated from the University of Nevada, Reno, where she has served as an adjunct professor since 2006.

Tolles declared her candidacy for the Assembly in 2015. She prevailed in both the Republican primary and general election, which she won with over 60% of the vote.  She was re-elected in 2018. She ran opposed in 2020, and opted not to run in 2022, being replaced by Selena La Rue Hatch.

Personal life
Tolles married her husband Par in 1998. They have two daughters.

Political positions
Tolles opposes raising the minimum wage. She identifies as fiscally conservative. In March 2017, Tolles was the only Republican member of the Assembly and one of only two Republican legislators, along with Senator Heidi Gansert, to vote in favor of ratification of the Equal Rights Amendment.

Electoral history

References

External links
 
 Campaign website
 Legislative website

1974 births
Living people
Republican Party members of the Nevada Assembly
People from Greensboro, North Carolina
Politicians from Reno, Nevada
University of Nevada, Reno alumni
Women state legislators in Nevada
21st-century American politicians
21st-century American women politicians